The Boston mayoral election of 1937 occurred on Tuesday, November 2, 1937. Boston School Committee member Maurice J. Tobin defeated five other candidates, including former mayors James Michael Curley and Malcolm Nichols. 

In 1918, the Massachusetts state legislature had passed legislation making the Mayor of Boston ineligible to serve consecutive terms. Thus, incumbent Frederick Mansfield was unable to run for re-election. The law would be changed in 1939, making this the last election where the incumbent mayor could not run for re-election.

Tobin was inaugurated on Monday, January 3, 1938.

Candidates
Carleton L. Brett, former Boston police officer
James Michael Curley, Governor of Massachusetts from 1935 to 1937, Mayor of Boston from 1914 to 1918, 1922 to 1926, 1930 to 1934, and member of the United States House of Representatives from 1913 to 1914
William J. Foley, District Attorney of Suffolk County since 1927
Malcolm Nichols, Mayor of Boston from 1926 to 1930
Alfred Santosuosso, lawyer
Maurice J. Tobin, member of the Boston School Committee since 1931

Results

See also
List of mayors of Boston, Massachusetts

References

Further reading
 

Boston mayoral
Boston
1937
Non-partisan elections
1930s in Boston